Exosome component 2, also known as EXOSC2, is a protein which in humans is encoded by the EXOSC2 gene.

Function 

Mammalian mRNAs contain AU-rich elements (AREs) within their three prime untranslated regions. In yeast, 3-prime-to-5-prime mRNA degradation is mediated by the exosome, a multisubunit particle. EXOSC2 (which is homologous to the yeast Rrp4 protein) is a component of the human exosome.

Interactions 
Exosome component 2 has been shown to interact with:
 Exosome component 4, and
 Exosome component 7.

References

Further reading